"Countdown" is a hardbop jazz standard composed by American jazz saxophonist John Coltrane that was first featured on his fifth studio album, Giant Steps, in 1960. The song is a contrafact of Miles Davis's "Tune Up", which is reharmonized to the Coltrane changes. The original recording has been described as having "resolute intensity . . . [that] does more to modernize jazz in 141 seconds than many artists do in their entire careers".

Composition 

The song is a 16-bar form. Each four bars incorporates the same tonal centers of "Tune Up", which are D major, C major, and B♭ major.

Each tonal center begins with the ii chord but then cycles through two different keys before arriving at the I chord. The ii chord is followed by a dominant 7 chord that is a half step above—using the first four bars as an example, this would be Em7 and F7. This dominant 7 chord resolves in a V-I manner—F7 to B♭Δ7. The next key center is cycled to by playing the dominant 7th chord a minor third up from the last key center—D♭7 to G♭Δ7 to A7 to DΔ7. The next four bars, and new key, starts by making the I chord the ii of the next key.

Notable recordings 

 John Coltrane in Giant Steps (1960)
 Benny Green Quintet in Prelude (1989)
 Brad Mehldau in Introducing Brad Mehldau (1995)
 Allan Holdsworth in None Too Soon (1996)
 Kenny Garrett in Pursuance: The Music of John Coltrane (1996)
 Steve Kuhn in Countdown (1998)
 Brad Mehldau Trio in Brad Mehldau Trio Live (2008)
 Victor Bailey in Slippin' N' Trippin (2009)
 Joey Alexander in Countdown (2016)
 Simon Moullier Trio in Countdown (2020)
 Michael Sagmeister in Story Board (2021)

See also 

 Coltrane changes

Notes

References 

1960s jazz standards
Compositions by John Coltrane
Hard bop jazz standards
Jazz compositions in B-flat major
Jazz standards
John Coltrane